Iver Grunnet (born March 9, 1952) is a former Danish handball player who competed in the 1980 Summer Olympics.

He was born in Tiset, Aarhus.

In 1980 he finished ninth with the Danish team in the Olympic tournament. He played three matches and scored three goals.

See also 
 Denmark at the 1980 Summer Olympics

External links
 profile

1952 births
Living people
Danish male handball players
Olympic handball players of Denmark
Handball players at the 1980 Summer Olympics
Sportspeople from Aarhus